The 2006 Kraft Nabisco Championship was a women's professional golf tournament, held March 30  to April 2 at Mission Hills Country Club in Rancho Mirage, California. It was the 35th edition of the Kraft Nabisco Championship, and the 24th as a major championship. The purse was $1.8 million, with a winner's share of $270,000.

In a sudden-death playoff, 2000 champion Karrie Webb defeated Lorena Ochoa with a birdie on the first extra hole, the par-5  Webb had earlier holed out for an eagle on the same hole to card a 65 (−7) in the final round to force the playoff. Ochoa recorded a 62 (−10) in the first round, but was one over-par for the final 54 holes; she also eagled the 72nd hole. One stroke out of the playoff were Natalie Gulbis and Michelle Wie, then 

It was Webb's second win at this event and her seventh major title, the first in nearly four years, since the Women's British Open in 2002. Through 2016, it is her most recent victory in a major.

Past champions in the field

Made the cut

Missed the cut

Source:

Round summaries

First round
Thursday, March 30, 2006

Source:

Second round
Friday, March 31, 2006

Source:

Amateurs: A. Park (−3), Martinez (+3), Michaels (+6), I. Park (+6).

Third round
Saturday, April 1, 2006

Source:

Final round
Sunday, April 2, 2006

Source:

Amateurs: A. Park (+2), Martinez (+16), I. Park (+16), Michaels (+20)

Scorecard
Final round

Cumulative tournament scores, relative to par
{|class="wikitable" span = 50 style="font-size:85%;
|-
|style="background: Red;" width=10|
|Eagle
|style="background: Pink;" width=10|
|Birdie
|style="background: PaleGreen;" width=10|
|Bogey
|}

Playoff
The sudden-death playoff began on the par-5 18th hole; Webb birdied to win the title.

References

External links
Golf Observer leaderboard

Chevron Championship
Golf in California
Kraft Nabisco Championship
Kraft Nabisco Championship
Kraft Nabisco Championship
Kraft Nabisco Championship
Kraft Nabisco Championship